Amy Geller is an American documentary film director and producer. She is best known for her work on the documentaries The Rabbi Goes West and The Guys Next Door.

Life and career
Geller was born in Hampton, New Hampshire. She holds a B.A. from Bates College and an M.F.A. in Cinema and Media Production from Boston University. She has served as the artistic director of the Boston Jewish Film Festival and was President of Women in Film and Video New England. She teaches at Boston University and Emerson College. She is also a member of Film Fatales, the Documentary Producers Alliance, IDA and IFP New York. In 2015, she received a Chai in the Hub Award for young Jewish leadership and, in 2016, a Boston University Women's Guild Scholarship.

Geller co-directed her debut feature documentary, The Guys Next Door, along with Allie Humenuk, which premiered at the Sarasota Film Festival in 2016 and was broadcast on the World Channel. In 2019, she co-directed a documentary, The Rabbi Goes West, along with Gerald Peary, about a Chabad Hasidic rabbi and his family who built a shul in their Montana home.

Filmography

Awards and nominations

References

External links
 
 

Living people
American documentary film directors
American documentary film producers
American women documentary filmmakers
Year of birth missing (living people)